Colasposoma aruwimiense is a species of leaf beetles of the Democratic Republic of the Congo, described by Irish entomologist Charles Joseph Gahan in 1892.

References 

aruwimiense
Beetles of the Democratic Republic of the Congo
Taxa named by Charles Joseph Gahan
Endemic fauna of the Democratic Republic of the Congo
Beetles described in 1892